The Event ("Etefagh") is an Iranian TV program hosted by Reza Rashidpour. The program dealt with topics in the fields of science, culture, society, politics and sports with the presence of prominent figures in each of these fields. The Event ended after the end of Ramadan on May 24, 2020.

The Event aired every Thursday and Friday night on IRIB TV3. It was produced by Mohammad Reza Rezaeian and directed by Siavash Saffarianpour and Mohammad Reza Rezaeian.

Guests

The Event: Ninety and New 

The Event: Ninety and New is a special Nowruz live program performed by Reza Rashidpour, which aired on IRIB TV3 in the days close to the 1399 Iranian year and continued until hours after New Year. This talk show program celebrated the New Year with the people in the last hours of the year and after New Year, with the presence of famous guests and guests from the people. The first season of this program started on 18 March 2020 and ended on 20 March 2020.

This program, performed by Reza Rashidpour and attended by dozens of prominent figures from various fields of science, culture, sports and art, as well as the young elites of the country, were the special guests of the program of the New Year of IRIB TV3.

Title music

The Event: Ninety and New guests

Awards and nominations

References 

Television talk shows